Minister for Mental Health is a position in the government of Western Australia, currently held by Amber-Jade Sanderson of the Labor Party. The position was first created after the 2008 state election, for the government of Colin Barnett. The minister is responsible for the state government's Mental Health Commission.

Titles
 23 September 2008 – present: Minister for Mental Health

List of ministers

See also
 Minister for Health (Western Australia)

References

 David Black (2014), The Western Australian Parliamentary Handbook (Twenty-Third Edition). Perth [W.A.]: Parliament of Western Australia.

Mental Health
Minister for Mental Health
Mental health in Australia
Health in Western Australia